Frans Janssens (born 25 September 1945 in Turnhout) is a retired Belgian footballer.

During his career he played for K. Lierse S.K. He earned 2 caps for the Belgium national football team, and participated in the 1970 FIFA World Cup and UEFA Euro 1972.

Honours

Player 

 Lierse SK

 Belgian Cup: 1968-69

International

Belgium 

 UEFA Euro 1972: Third place
Individual

 Man of the Season (Belgian First Division): 1973–74

References 

Royal Belgian Football Association: Number of caps

External links
 

1945 births
Living people
Sportspeople from Turnhout
Belgian footballers
Belgium international footballers
1970 FIFA World Cup players
UEFA Euro 1972 players
Lierse S.K. players
Belgian Pro League players
Association football forwards
Footballers from Antwerp Province
20th-century Belgian people